The 1970 FIFA World Cup qualification UEFA Group 8 was a UEFA qualifying group for the 1970 FIFA World Cup. The group comprised Bulgaria, Luxembourg, Netherlands and Poland.

Standings

Matches

Notes

External links 
Group 8 Detailed Results at RSSSF

8
1968–69 in Bulgarian football
1969–70 in Bulgarian football
1968–69 in Dutch football
1969–70 in Dutch football
1968–69 in Luxembourgian football
1969–70 in Luxembourgian football
1968–69 in Polish football
1969–70 in Polish football